Thauera mechernichensis is a bacterium from the genus of Thauera which was isolated from a landfill leachate treatment plant.

References

External links
Type strain of Thauera mechernichensis at BacDive -  the Bacterial Diversity Metadatabase

Rhodocyclaceae
Bacteria described in 1999